Anu Sivaraman (born on 25 May 1966) is the judge of Kerala High Court. The High Court of Kerala is the highest court in the Indian state of Kerala and in the Union Territory of Lakshadweep. The High Court of Kerala is headquartered at Ernakulam, Kochi.

Early life
Sivaraman completed her schooling from St.Teresa's Convent Girls High School, joined for graduation in English Literature at St. Teresa's College and completed from Maharaja's College, Ernakulam, completed Diploma in Journalism from Kerala Media Academy in 1987 and obtained a law degree from Government Law College, Ernakulam.

Career
Sivaraman enrolled as an Advocate in 1991. During her practice, she served as Standing Counsel for the Corporation of Cochin from 2001 to 2010, Senior Government Pleader from January 2007 and Special Government Pleader (Co-operation) during 2010-2011. On 10 April 2015 she was appointed as additional judge of Kerala High Court and became permanent from 5 April 2017

References

External links
 High Court of Kerala

Living people
Judges of the Kerala High Court
21st-century Indian judges
1966 births